Passion, Grace & Fire is the second album by John McLaughlin, Al Di Meola and Paco de Lucía released in 1983. Unlike their first album Friday Night in San Francisco, this album consists entirely of studio recordings.

Track listing

Side one
"Aspan" (John McLaughlin)  – 4:09
"Orient Blue Suite" (Al Di Meola)  – 7:08
 Part I
 Part II
 Part III
"Chiquito" (Paco de Lucía)  – 4:46

Side two
"Sichia" (Paco de Lucía)  – 3:50
"David" (John McLaughlin)  – 6:30
"Passion, Grace & Fire" (Al Di Meola)  – 5:26

Personnel 

John McLaughlin - plays on centre channel - nylon-string guitar.
Al Di Meola - plays on left channel - Ovation steel-string acoustic guitar.
Paco de Lucía - plays on right channel - nylon-string guitar.

Chart performance

References

1983 albums
Al Di Meola albums
Paco de Lucía albums
John McLaughlin (musician) albums
Collaborative albums
Albums with cover art by Hipgnosis